Rostami or Rustami or Rostamian (from ) is a family name that refers to the ancient Persian hero called Rostam. The ancient monuments of Naqsh-e Rustam and The Book of Kings (Shahnameh) narrate all about Rostam The Invincible. Both Rostam (as a first name) and Rostami (as a family name) are popular in many regions of the Middle East (mainly in Iran, Iraqi Kurdistan, Azerbaijan, Turkey, Afghanistan, Tajikistan and Uzbekistan), Russia (written as Rustemi in Soviet Union Countries) and might be found in Asia (for instance in India, Bangladesh, Pakistan and even in Malaysia or Indonesia).

Notable people with the surname include:

People

Abbas Kia Rostami (1940–2016), Renowned film director and producer
Jamil Rostami (born 1971), Film director
Kianoush Rostami (born 1991), Weightlifter (Olympic medalist)
Mohammad Rostami (born 1985), Footballer
Morteza Rostami (born 1980), Taekwondo athlete
Rahim Rostami (born 1991), Kurdish asylum seeker
Rouhollah Rostami, Powerlifter (Paralympic medalist)
Shahram Rostami (born 1948), Fighter pilot

See also

Rostam (the hero)
Rostam (name)
Rostami (disambiguation)

References